Hans Peter Blochwitz (born 28 September 1949) is a German lyric tenor, who is known internationally in opera and concert, especially for singing parts in Mozart operas.

Career 
Born in Garmisch-Partenkirchen on 28 September 1949, Blochwitz first studied computer science at the Technische Hochschule Darmstadt and holds a Ph.D. He studied singing from 1975 in Mainz with Elisabeth Fellner Köberle and in Frankfurt with Erna Westenberger and Karlheinz Jarius. He appeared in 1978 in Frankfurt as a soloist in Bach's Mass in B minor, and in 1984 as the Evangelist in Bach's St Matthew Passion at the Altenberger Dom. He made his operatic debut in September 1984 as Lenski in Tchaikovsky's Eugen Onegin at the Frankfurt Opera; he subsequently sang in Brussels, Geneva, Hamburg, Milan, and Vienna, especially as a Mozart singer. When Peter Schreier, a lyric tenor himself, conducted his first production of Mozart's Don Giovanni in 1987, he cast Blochwitz as Don Ottavio. In September 1990 Blochwitz made his debut at the Metropolitan Opera in the same role. In 1991 he appeared as Belmonte in Mozart's Die Entführung aus dem Serail at the Salzburg Festival.

Blochwitz was also in demand as a singer of oratorio and lieder. He premiered Hans Zender's Schuberts "Winterreise", subtitled Eine komponierte Interpretation (A composed interpretation) in 1993, with the Ensemble Modern conducted by the composer. The same musicians made the first recording of the work. He has held a professorship at the University of the Arts Bern since 2000.

Recordings

His recorded works include several oratorios: Bach's St Matthew Passion, Christmas Oratorio and Mass in B minor, Mozart's Requiem in the Süssmayr completion, Haydn's Die Schöpfung, Mendelssohn's Paulus, and Mahler's Das klagende Lied and Das Lied von der Erde. In opera, he recorded Mozart's La finta semplice, Così fan tutte, Don Giovanni, Die Entführung aus dem Serail (video, DVD) and Die Zauberflöte, and Beethoven's Fidelio (as Jacquino). He recorded lieder: Schubert's Die schöne Müllerin, Robert Schumann's Dichterliebe, and Die schöne Magelone by Brahms.

References

External links 
 
 
 , no. 9 from Schubert's song cycle Die schöne Müllerin,  (piano)

German operatic tenors
1949 births
Living people
Place of birth missing (living people)
Technische Universität Darmstadt alumni
People from Garmisch-Partenkirchen
20th-century German  male opera singers